Tomáš Kuchař  (born 25 August 1976) is a Czech former footballer.

Career

Kuchař signed for Shinnik Yaroslavl in Russia in 2003 but did not like it there.

References

External links
 
 
 

1976 births
Living people
Czech footballers
Czech Republic under-21 international footballers
Czech expatriate footballers
Association football midfielders
Czech First League players
SK Slavia Prague players
FC Shinnik Yaroslavl players
Russian Premier League players
Expatriate footballers in Russia
FK Teplice players
Pogoń Szczecin players
Aris Limassol FC players
Ekstraklasa players
Cypriot First Division players
Expatriate footballers in Poland
Expatriate footballers in Cyprus
Czech expatriate sportspeople in Poland
Bohemians 1905 players
People from Kolín District
Sportspeople from the Central Bohemian Region